Robin Hughes (7 June 192010 December 1989) was a British film and television actor.

Life and career
Robin Hughes was born on 7 June 1920 in Buenos Aires, Argentina, to English parents, Rosa Violet (Pitt) and Harold William Hughes. His father was head of the British Royal Wheat Commission, and Hughes spent his childhood moving from country to country as his father was transferred in government service; consequently, his early schooling was acquired in South America, Canada, Mozambique, East Africa and other places. At the age of 18, he joined the Royal Navy as a signalman and at the end of the Second World War, he left the service as lieutenant commander. Robin had received officer's papers, however, the day before Hood set to sea, and was sent to officer's training instead of boarding the ship with his mates. In the tragedy, 1,415 men died; only three survived...or, as Robin Hughes stated, "...four." 
He went to the United States in 1948 and appeared in many theatre, television and film roles. In 1958 he appeared as the amorous editor Brian O'Bannion in Auntie Mame opposite Rosalind Russell. That year he made two guest appearances on Perry Mason: first as murderer Addison Doyle in "The Case of the Green-Eyed Sister", then as Rodney Beaton in "The Case of the Buried Clock". He is also known for playing the title role (Satan) in The Twilight Zone episode "The Howling Man".

He died on 10 December 1989 in Los Angeles from complications of liver disease. He was married to Ursula Klara Binias on April 26th 1969 until their divorce on June 26th 1980. They had one child.

Career

Partial filmography

 Hue and Cry (1947) – Selwyn Pike
 Green Dolphin Street (1947) – Sailor (uncredited)
 Forever Amber (1947) – Benvolio (uncredited)
 If Winter Comes (1947) – A.R.P. Member (uncredited)
 Port Said (1948) – Bunny Beacham
 My Own True Love (1948) – English Officer (uncredited)
 Kiss the Blood Off My Hands (1948) – Policeman (uncredited)
 Command Decision (1948) – R.A.F. Officer (uncredited)
 Enchantment (1948) – Corporal
 Look for the Silver Lining (1949) – Lieutenant (uncredited)
 The Secret of St. Ives (1949) – Corporal (uncredited)
 Sword in the Desert (1949) – Soldier (uncredited)
 When Willie Comes Marching Home (1950) – Marine Officer (uncredited)
 Three Came Home (1950) – Australian POW (uncredited)
 The Flame and the Arrow (1950) – Skinner
 Fancy Pants (1950) – Cyril (uncredited)
 Cyrano de Bergerac (1950) – Cadet
 Kim (1950) – British Officer (uncredited)
 The 13th Letter (1951) – Intern (uncredited)
 Secrets of Monte Carlo (1951) – Charles Reeves
 Darling, How Could You! (1951) – George Neville (uncredited)
 The Desert Fox: The Story of Rommel (1951) – Medic (uncredited)
 The Son of Dr. Jekyll (1951) – Alec – Roommate (uncredited)
 Quo Vadis (1951) – Christ (voice, uncredited)
 Mutiny (1952) – Lt. Vaughan (uncredited)
 Million Dollar Mermaid (1952) – English Reporter (uncredited)
 Rogue's March (1953) – Captain Ashe (uncredited)
 Titanic (1953) – Junior Officer (uncredited)
 The Maze (1953) – Richard Roblar
 Flame of Calcutta (1953) – Lt. Bob Ramsey (uncredited)
 El Alaméin (1953) – Sgt. Alf Law
 Money from Home (1953) – Playfair – Hunt Club Ball Guest (uncredited)
 Charge of the Lancers (1954) – Soldier / Messenger (uncredited)
 Paris Playboys (1954) – Lestrade (uncredited)
 Dial M for Murder (1954) – Police Sergeant O'Brien
 King Richard and the Crusaders (1954) – King's Guard (uncredited)
 Khyber Patrol (1954) – Tall Major in Lounge
 Untamed (1955) – Man at Irish Ball (uncredited)
 The Scarlet Coat (1955) – Col. Tarleton (uncredited)
 The Court Jester (1955) – Black Fox's Man with Message (uncredited)
 The Mole People (1956) – First Officer
 Johnny Tremain (1957) – British Naval Officer (uncredited)
 Manhunt in the Jungle (1958) – Cmdr. George M. Dyott
 The Thing That Couldn't Die (1958) – Gideon Drew
 The Buccaneer (1958) – Lt. Rogers
 Auntie Mame (1958) – Brian O'Bannion
 Battle of the Coral Sea (1959) – Maj. Jammy Harris
 The Road to Hong Kong (1962) – American Official (uncredited)
 He Who Rides a Tiger (1965) – Det. Sgt. Crowley
 Star! (1968) – Third Hyde Park Speaker (uncredited)
 The Seven Minutes (1971) – Ashcroft (uncredited) (final film role)

Television

 The Bigelow Theatre (1 episode, 1951)
 Four Star Playhouse (1 episode, 1954) – Army Sergeant
 Cavalcade of America (2 episodes, 1954) – Lt. Col. Carleton
 Schlitz Playhouse of Stars (1 episode, 1954) – Sandstrom
 The Star and the Story (2 episodes, 1955–1956) – Count d'Alba / Tom Clark
 Crusader (1 episode, 1956) – Frank McKenna
 The Adventures of Wild Bill Hickok (1 episode, 1956) – Emerson Gilhaven
 You Are There  (4 episodes, 1955–1956) – Cassius / British Official / Admiral Reginald Hall
 The Brothers (3 episodes, 1956–1957) – Barrington Steel
 Cheyenne (1 episode, 1957) – Capt.. Baylor
 The Gray Ghost (1 episode, 1958) – Andrews
 Zorro (4 episodes, 1958) – Esteban Rojas (uncredited)
 The Adventures of Jim Bowie (1 episode, 1958) – Vivian St. John
 Mickey Spillane's Mike Hammer (1 episode, 1958) – Mr. Carlyle
 Perry Mason (2 episodes, 1958) – Rodney Beaton / Addison Doyle
 Flight (1 episode)
 Markham (1 episode, 1959) – Charlie – Poet
 Sugarfoot (1 episode, 1959) – Dougal MacBrewster
 Westinghouse Desilu Playhouse (1 episode, 1959) – Gerald Lester
 Walt Disney's Wonderful World of Color (1 episode, 1960) – Hitchcock
 Hawaiian Eye (1 episode, 1960) – Bryan Semple
 Men into Space (1 episode, 1960) – Captain Tom Hetherford
 The Twilight Zone (1 episode, 1960) – Howling Man
 The Islanders (1 episode, 1960) – Colonel Arthur Munson
 Boris Karloff's Thriller (1 episode, 1961) – Collins ('A Terribly Strange Bed')
 77 Sunset Strip (2 episodes, 1959–1961) – Nicky Bascombe / Mr. Sandby
 The Brothers Brannagan (1 episode, 1961) – Hilliary
 Alcoa Presents: One Step Beyond (1 episode, 1961) – Jake
 The Adventures of Sir Francis Drake (1 episode, 1962) – Adam Forrester
 The Saint (1 episode, 1962) – Harry Tiltman
 The Human Jungle (1 episode, 1963) – Sir Francis Leigh Brooke
 Ghost Squad (1 episode, 1963) – Dave Welford
 The Loner (1 episode, 1965) – Jamison Smithley Carruthers
 Garrison's Gorillas (1 episode, 1967) – Jonathan Brown

References

Further reading
 "Educated Toes Bring Actors Fame". Elmira Star-Gazette. June 29, 1950. p. 36
 Schallert, Edwin (January 16, 1953). "'Road to Rome' Pleases in Sturges Production". The Los Angeles Times. p. 51
 "TV Actress Names Actor as Baby's Father". The Los Angeles Times. August 5, 1954. p. 5 
 "Actor Denies Paternity Charge by TV Actress". The Los Angeles Times. August 11, 1954. p. 5
 "Actor Fathered Baby of Actress, Judge Rules". The Los Angeles Times. November 19, 1954. p. 4
 "Births". Variety. November 21, 1956. p. 63
 "Here and There". Hollywood Reporter. November 6, 1957. p. 6
 Hopper, Hedda (June 27, 1958). "Hollywood; 'Auntie Mame's' Farewell". New York Daily News. p. 16
 "TV Scout: Up-to-the-Minute Program Review". Madera Tribune. September 5, 1961. p. 2

External links
 
 Robin Hughes Blog

1920 births
1989 deaths
British male film actors
British male television actors
British expatriates in Argentina
British expatriate male actors in the United States
Royal Navy officers of World War II
20th-century British male actors